The Great Synagogue of Europe, formerly known as the Great Synagogue of Brussels, is the main synagogue in Brussels, Belgium which was dedicated as a focal point for European Jews in 2008.

The building was designed in 1875 in a Romanesque-Byzantine style by the architect Désiré De Keyser and constructed in 1878. It is located at 32 Rue de la Régence in Brussels. The synagogue survived the Holocaust in which 25,000 Belgian Jews died. Its chief rabbi is Albert Guigui and there are approximately 15,000 persons of Jewish faith in the city (as of 2008).

On Rosh Hashanah, 18 September 1982, the synagogue was attacked by a man with a submachine gun, seriously wounding four people. The attack has been attributed to the Abu Nidal Organization.

It was dedicated as the "Great Synagogue of Europe" on 4 June 2008 by President José Manuel Barroso and two of Europe's leading rabbis who signed a document of dedication. The ceremony also involved singing by the European Choir and the reading of a "Prayer for Europe." The prayer wished for EU leaders to act justly in creating a "spiritual union" and to ask for happiness for European citizens.

The act was of a more political nature, as in the 19th century, responding to the Age of Enlightenment, Great Synagogues were built in many capitals of Europe to show that Jews were full and free citizens. This is something the Jewish community now wished to show at a European level. It is hoped that the building will become a focus for Judaism in Europe, as St. Peter's Basilica is for Roman Catholics.

See also
 Conference of European Rabbis
 History of the Jews in Europe
 Religion in the European Union

References

Jews and Judaism in Brussels
Synagogues in Belgium
Religious buildings and structures in Brussels
Romanesque Revival synagogues
Abu Nidal attacks
Palestinian terrorist incidents in Europe
Synagogues completed in 1878
20th-century attacks on synagogues and Jewish communal organizations
1878 establishments in Belgium
Byzantine Revival synagogues